The Imperial Russian Army (tr. ) was the armed land force of the Russian Empire, active from around 1721 to the Russian Revolution of 1917. In the early 1850s, the Russian Army consisted of more than 900,000 regular soldiers and nearly 250,000 irregulars (mostly Cossacks).

Precursors: Regiments of the New Order
Russian tsars before Peter the Great maintained professional hereditary musketeer corps known as streltsy. These were originally raised by Ivan the Terrible; originally an effective force, they had become highly unreliable and undisciplined. In times of war the armed forces were augmented by peasants.

The regiments of the new order, or regiments of the foreign order (Полки нового строя or Полки иноземного строя, Polki novovo (inozemnovo) stroya), was the Russian term that was used to describe military units that were formed in the Tsardom of Russia in the 17th century according to the Western European military standards.

There were different kinds of regiments, such as the regulars, dragoons, and reiters. In 1631, the Russians created two regular regiments in Moscow. During the Smolensk War of 1632–1634, six more regular regiments, one reiter regiment, and a dragoon regiment were formed. Initially, they recruited children of the landless boyars and streltsy, volunteers, Cossacks and others. Commanding officers comprised mostly foreigners. After the war with Poland, all of the regiments were disbanded. During another Russo-Polish War, they were created again and became a principal force of the Russian Army. Often, regular and dragoon regiments were manned with datochniye lyudi for lifelong military service. Reiters were manned with small or landless gentry and boyars' children and were paid with money (or lands) for their service. More than a half of the commanding officers were representatives from the gentry. In times of peace, some of the regiments were usually disbanded.

In 1681, there were 33 regular regiments (61,000 men) and 25 dragoon and reiter regiments (29,000 men). In the late 17th century, regiments of the new type represented more than a half of the Russian Army and at the beginning of the 18th century were used for creating a regular army.

Introduction of conscription

Conscription in Russia was introduced by Peter the Great in December 1699, though reports say Peter's father also used it. The conscripts were called "recruits" (not to be confused with voluntary army recruitment, which did not appear until the early 20th century).

Peter formed a modern regular army built on the German model, but with a new aspect: officers not necessarily from nobility, as talented commoners were given promotions that eventually included a noble title at the attainment of an officer's rank (such promotions were later abolished during the reign of Catherine the Great). Conscription of peasants and townspeople was based on quota system, per settlement. Initially it was based on the number of households, later it was based on the population numbers.

The term of service in the 18th century was for life. In 1793 it was reduced to 25 years. In 1834, it was reduced to 20 years plus five years in the reserve, and in 1855 to 12 years plus three years in the reserve.

1760s
The history of the Russian Army in this era was linked to the name of Russian General Alexander Suvorov, considered to be one of the few great generals in history who never lost a battle.

From 1777 to 1783 Suvorov served in the Crimea and in the Caucasus, becoming a lieutenant-general in 1780, and general of infantry in 1783, on the conclusion of his work there. From 1787 to 1791 he again fought the Turks during the Russo-Turkish War of 1787–1792 and won many victories. Suvorov's leadership also played a key role in a Russian victory over the Poles during the Kościuszko Uprising.

Imperial Russian Army in 1805

As a major European power, Russia could not escape the wars involving Revolutionary France and the First French Empire, but as an adversary to Napoleon, the leadership of the new emperor, Alexander I of Russia (r. 1801–1825), who came to the throne as the result of his father's assassination (in which he was rumoured to be implicated) became crucial.

The Russian Army in 1805 had many characteristics of Ancien Régime organization: there was no permanent formation above the regimental level, senior officers were largely recruited from aristocratic circles, and the Russian soldier, in line with 18th-century practice, was regularly beaten and punished to instill discipline. Furthermore, many lower-level officers were poorly trained and had difficulty getting their men to perform the sometimes complex manoeuvres required in a battle. Nevertheless, the Russians did have a fine artillery arm manned by soldiers trained in academies and who would regularly fight hard to prevent their pieces from falling into enemy hands.

Both the Russians and Austrians met a decisive military defeat at the hands of Napoleon during the Battle of Austerlitz in 1805.

Napoleonic Wars

The War of the Fourth Coalition (1806–1807) involving Prussia, Russia, Saxony, Sweden and the United Kingdom against France formed within months of the collapse of the previous coalition. In August 1806, King Frederick William III of Prussia made the decision to go to war independently of any other great power except neighbouring Russia. Another course of action might have involved declaring war the previous year and joining Austria and Russia. This might have contained Napoleon and prevented the Allied disaster in the Battle of Austerlitz. In any event, the Russian Army, an ally of Prussia, still remained far away when Prussia declared war.

Napoleon smashed the main Prussian armies at the Battle of Jena–Auerstedt on 14 October 1806 and hunted down the survivors during the remainder of October and November. Having destroyed all Prussian forces west of the Oder, Napoleon pushed east to seize Warsaw. In late December, the initial clashes between the French and Russians at Czarnowo, Golymin, and Pułtusk were without result. The French emperor put his troops into winter quarters east of the Vistula River, but the new Russian commander Levin August von Bennigsen refused to remain passive.

Bennigsen shifted his army north into East Prussia and launched a stroke at the French strategic left wing. The main force of the blow was evaded by the French at the Battle of Mohrungen in late January 1807. In response, Napoleon mounted a counterattack designed to cut off the Russians. Bennigsen managed to avoid entrapment and the two sides fought the Battle of Eylau on 7 and 8 February 1807. After this indecisive bloodbath both sides belatedly went into winter quarters. In early June, Bennigsen mounted an offensive that was quickly parried by the French. Napoleon launched a pursuit toward Königsberg but the Russians successfully fended it off at the Battle of Heilsberg. On 14 June, Bennigsen unwisely fought the Battle of Friedland with a river at his back and saw his army mauled with heavy losses. Following this defeat, Alexander was forced to sue for peace with Napoleon at Tilsit on 7 July 1807, with Russia becoming Napoleon's ally. Russia lost little territory under the treaty, and Alexander made use of his alliance with Napoleon for further expansion. Napoleon created the Duchy of Warsaw out of former Prussian territory.

At the Congress of Erfurt (September–October 1808) Napoleon and Alexander agreed that Russia should force Sweden to join the Continental System, which led to the Finnish War of 1808–1809 and to the division of Sweden into two parts separated by the Gulf of Bothnia. The eastern part became the Russian Grand Duchy of Finland.

The Russo-Turkish War broke out in 1805–06 against the background of the Napoleonic Wars. The Ottoman Empire, encouraged by the Russian defeat in the Battle of Austerlitz, deposed the Russophile hospodars of its vassal states Moldavia (Alexander Mourouzis) and Wallachia (Constantine Ypsilantis). Simultaneously, their French allies occupied Dalmatia and threatened to penetrate the Danubian principalities at any time. In order to safeguard the Russian border against a possible French attack and support the First Serbian uprising, a 40,000-strong Russian contingent advanced into Moldavia and Wallachia. The Sultan reacted by blocking the Dardanelles to Russian ships in 1807 and declared war on Russia. The war lasted until 1812.

In the Finnish War Alexander wrested the Grand Duchy of Finland from Sweden in 1809, and acquired Bessarabia from Turkey in 1812.

Anglo-Russian War (1807–1812)
The requirement of joining France's Continental Blockade against Britain was a serious disruption of Russian commerce, and in 1810 Alexander repudiated the obligation. This strategic change was followed by a substantial reform in the army undertaken by Michael Andreas Barclay de Tolly as the Minister of War.

At the same time, Russia continued its expansion. The Congress of Vienna created the Kingdom of Poland (Russian Poland), to which Alexander granted a constitution. Thus, Alexander I became the constitutional monarch of Poland while remaining the autocratic Emperor of Russia. He was also the Grand Duke of Finland, which had been annexed from Sweden in 1809 and awarded autonomous status.

The Russo-French alliance gradually became strained. Napoleon was concerned about Russia's intentions in the strategically vital Bosphorus and Dardanelles straits. At the same time, Alexander viewed the Duchy of Warsaw, the French-controlled reconstituted Polish state, with suspicion. The result was the War of the Sixth Coalition from 1812 to 1814.

French invasion of Russia

In 1812, Napoleon invaded Russia to compel Alexander I to remain in the Continental System and to remove the imminent threat of Russian invasion of Poland. The Grande Armée, 650,000 men (270,000 Frenchmen and many soldiers of allies or subject powers), crossed the Neman on 23 June 1812. Russia proclaimed a Patriotic War, while Napoleon proclaimed a Second Polish war, but against the expectations of the Poles who supplied almost 100,000 troops for the invasion force he avoided any concessions toward Poland, having in mind further negotiations with Russia.  Russia maintained a scorched earth policy of retreat, broken only by the Battle of Borodino on 7 September, when the Russians stood and fought. This was bloody and the Russians eventually retreated, opening the road to Moscow. Field Marshal Mikhail Kutuzov made the decision in order to preserve the army. By 14 September, the French captured Moscow. The Russian governor Prince Rastopchin ordered the city burnt to the ground and large parts of it were destroyed. Alexander I refused to capitulate, and with no sign of clear victory in sight, Napoleon was forced to withdraw from Moscow's ruins. So the disastrous Great Retreat began, with 370,000 casualties largely as a result of starvation and the freezing weather conditions, and 200,000 captured. Napoleon narrowly escaped total annihilation at the Battle of Berezina, but his army was wrecked nevertheless. By December only 20,000 fit soldiers from the main army were among those who recrossed the Neman at Kaunas. By this time Napoleon had abandoned his army to return to Paris and prepare a defence against the advancing Russians.

1813 Campaign in Germany
As the French retreated, the Russians pursued them into Poland and Prussia, causing the Prussian Corps under Ludwig Yorck von Wartenburg that had been formerly a part of the Grande Armée to ultimately change sides in the Convention of Tauroggen. This soon forced Prussia to declare war on France, and with its mobilisation, for many Prussian officers serving in the Russian Army to leave, creating a serious shortage of experienced officers in the Russian Army. After the death of Kutuzov in early 1813, command of the Russian Army passed to Peter Wittgenstein. The campaign was noted for the number of sieges the Russian Army conducted and a large number of Narodnoe Opolcheniye (irregular troops) that continued to serve in its ranks until newly trained recruits could reach the area of combat operations. Aleksey Petrovich Yermolov emerged as one of the leading and talented senior commanders of the army, participating in many important battles, including the Battle of Leipzig.

In 1813 Russia gained territory in the Baku area of the Caucasus from Qajar Iran as much due to the news of Napoleon's defeat in 1812 as the fear by the Shah of a new campaign against him by the resurgent Russian Army where the 1810 campaign led by Matvei Platov failed. This was immediately used to raise new regiments, and to begin creating a greater foothold in the Caucasus. By the early 19th century, the empire also was firmly ensconced in Alaska reached via Cossack expeditions to Siberia, although only a rudimentary military presence was possible due to the distance from Europe.

1814 Campaign in France

The campaign in France was marked by persistent advances made by the Russian-led forces towards Paris despite attempts by Alexander's allies to allow Napoleon an avenue for surrender. In a brilliant deceptive manoeuvre Alexander was able to reach, and take Paris with the help of the treason of Marshal Marmont before Napoleon could reinforce its garrison, effectively ending the campaign. More pragmatically, in 1814 Russia, Britain, Austria, and Prussia had formed the Quadruple Alliance. The allies created an international system to maintain the territorial status quo and prevent the resurgence of an expansionist France. This included each ally maintaining a corps of occupation in France. The Quadruple Alliance, confirmed by a number of international conferences, ensured Russia's influence in Europe, if only because of the proven capability of its army to defeat that of Napoleon and to carry the war to Paris.

After the allies defeated Napoleon, Alexander played a prominent role in the redrawing of the map of Europe at the Congress of Vienna in 1815. Many of the prominent Russian commanders were feted in the European capitals, including London. In the same year, under the influence of religious mysticism, Alexander initiated the creation of the Holy Alliance, a loose agreement pledging the rulers of the nations involved—including most of Europe—to act according to Christian principles. This emerged in part due to the influence religion had played in the army during the war of 1812, and its influence on the common soldiers and officers alike.

The Russian occupation forces in France, though not participating in the Belgian campaign, re-entered combat against the minor French forces in the East and occupied several important fortresses.

Reforms

Following Russia's defeat in the Crimean War during the reign of Alexander II, the Minister of War, Count Dmitry Milyutin,
(who held the post from 16 May 1861 to 21 May 1881) introduced military reforms. The reforms carried on during Milyutin's long tenure abolished the system of conscription of children, and resulted in the levy system being introduced in Russia and military districts being created across the country.

As part of Milyutin's reforms, on 1 January 1874, the emperor approved a conscription statute that made military service compulsory for all 20-year-old males with the term reduced for land army to six years plus nine years in reserve. This conscription created a large pool of experienced military reservists who would be ready to mobilize in case of war. It also permitted the Russian Empire to maintain a smaller standing army in peacetime. Ironically, this reform was a disaster for the Tsarist regime. By reducing the length of service, peasant elders and officials could no longer threaten radical youths with conscription. Soldiers now kept their peasant identities and many learned new skills and became literate. They radicalised the villages on their return.

The system of military education was also reformed, and elementary education was made available to all the draftees. Milyutin's reforms are regarded as a milestone in the history of Russia: they dispensed with the military recruitment and professional army introduced by Peter the Great and created the Russian army such as it continued into the 21st century. Up to Dmitry Milyutin's reforms in 1874 the Russian Army had no permanent barracks and was billeted in dugouts and shacks.

The army saw service against the Turks during the Russo-Turkish War.

During the Boxer Rebellion 100,000 Russian troops fought to pacify part of Manchuria and to secure its railroads. Some Russian military forces were already stationed in China before the war, and one of them met a grotesque end at the Battle of Pai-t'ou-tzu when the dead Russians were mutilated by Chinese troops, who decapitated them and sliced crosses into their bodies. Other battles fought include Boxers attacks on Chinese Eastern Railway, Defence of Yingkou, Battles on Amur River, and the Russian Invasion of Northern and Central Manchuria.

The army's share of the budget fell from 30% to 18% in 1881–1902. By 1904 Russia was spending 57% and 63% of what Germany and Austria-Hungary were spending on each soldier, respectively. Army morale was broken by crushing over 1500 protests from 1883 to 1903.

The army was defeated by Japan during the Russo-Japanese War of 1904–05, notable engagements being the Siege of Port Arthur and the Battle of Mukden. There were over 400 mutinies from autumn 1905 to summer 1906.

World War I and revolution

At the outbreak of the war, Emperor Nicholas II appointed his cousin, Grand Duke Nicholas as Commander-in-Chief. On mobilization, the Russian Army totalled 115 infantry and 38 cavalry divisions with nearly 7,900 guns (7,100 field guns, 540 field howitzers and 257 heavy guns). There were only 2 army ambulances and 679 cars.  Divisions were allocated as follows: 32 infantry and 10.5 cavalry divisions to operate against Germany, 46 infantry and 18.5 cavalry divisions to operate against Austria-Hungary, 19.5 infantry and 5.5 cavalry divisions for the defence of the Baltic Sea and the Black Sea littorals, and 17 infantry and 3.5 cavalry divisions were to be transported in from Siberia and Turkestan.

Among the army's higher formations during the war were the Western Front, the Northwestern Front and the Romanian Front. The war in the East began with Russian invasion of East Prussia (1914) and the Austro-Hungarian province of Galicia. The first ended in a Russian defeat by the German Empire in the Battle of Tannenberg (1914). In the west, a Russian Expeditionary Force was dispatched to France in 1915. Amid the Russian Revolution of 1917 the Imperial Russian Army collapsed and dissolved. The rebellious remnants of the Imperial army evolved to become part of the new Red Army.

Organization

The Imperial Russian Army entered the Napoleonic Wars organized administratively and in the field on the same principles as it had been in the 18th century of units being assigned to campaign headquarters, and the "army" being known either for its senior commander, or the area of its operations. Administratively, the regiments were assigned to Military Inspections, the predecessors of military districts, and included the conscript training depots, garrisons and fortress troops and munitions magazines.

The army had been thoroughly reorganised on the Prussian model by the emperor's father Paul I against wishes of most of its officer corps, and with his demise immediate changes followed to remove much of the Prussianness from its character. Although the army had conventional European parts within it such as the monarch's guard, the infantry and cavalry of the line and field artillery, it also included a very large contingent of semi-regular Cossacks that in times of rare peace served to guard the Russian Empire's southern borders, and in times of war served as fully-fledged light cavalry, providing invaluable reconnaissance service often far better than that available to other European armies due to the greater degree of initiative and freedom of movement by Cossack detachments. The Ukrainian lands of the Empire also provided most of the Hussar and Ulan regiments for the regular light cavalry. Another unusual feature of the army that was seen twice during the period was the constitution of the Narodnoe Opolcheniye, for the first time since the coming to power of the Romanov dynasty.

In 1806 most of the Inspections were abolished, and replaced by divisions based on the French model although still territorially based. By 1809 there were 25 infantry divisions as permanent field formations, each organised around three infantry brigade and one artillery brigade. When Barclay de Tolly became the Minister of War in 1810, he instituted further reorganization and other changes in the army, down to company level, that saw the creation of separate grenadier divisions, and dedication of one brigade in each division to the jaeger light infantry for skirmishing in open order formations.

Imperial Guard

Throughout the Napoleonic Wars the Imperial Russian Guard was commanded by Grand Duke Konstantin. The guard grew from a few regiments to two infantry divisions combined into the V Infantry Corps commanded at Borodino by General Lieutenant Lavrov and two cavalry divisions with their own artillery and train by the conclusion of the 1814 campaign.

Infantry of the Guard
At Austerlitz in 1805 the infantry of the Guard included:
Guard Infantry Division – General Lieutenant Pyotr Malutin
 1st Brigade – General Major Leonty Depreradovich-I
 Preobrazhensky Lifeguard regiment (2 btns.)
 Semenovsky Lifeguard regiment (2 btns.)
 2nd Brigade – General Major Vasily Lobanov
 Izmailovsky Lifeguard regiment (2 btns.)
 Life Guard Jäger (1 btn.)
 Life Grenadier regiment (3 btns.)

At Borodino in 1812 the infantry of the Guard included:
Guard Infantry Division – General Lieutenant Nikolai Lavrov
 1st Brigade – General Major Baron Roman Rosen
 Preobrazhensky Lifeguard regiment (3 btns.)
 Semenovsky Lifeguard regiment (3 btns.)
 2nd Brigade — Colonel Vladimir Khrapovitsky
 Izmailovsky Lifeguard regiment (3 btns.)
 Lithuanian Lifeguard regiment (3 btns.)
 3rd Brigade — Colonel Baron Adam Bistrom
 Finnish Lifeguard regiment (3 btns.)
 Lifeguard Jäger regiment (3 btns.)

Cavalry of the Guard
At Austerlitz in 1805 the cavalry of the Guard included:
Guard Cavalry Division – General Lieutenant Andrei Kologrivov
 1st Brigade – General Major Ivan Yankovich
 Lifeguard Hussar regiment (4 sq.)
 2nd Brigade – General Major Nikolay Depreradovich
 Horse Guard regiment (4 sq.)
 Chevalier Guard Regiment (4 sq.)

At Borodino in 1812 the cavalry of the Guard included:
1st Cuirassier Division – General Major Nikolai Borozdin
 1st Brigade – General Major Ivan Shevich
 Horse Guard Regiment (4 sq.)
 Chevalier Guard Regiment (4 sq.)
 2nd Brigade – General Major Nikolai Borozdin
 His Majesty Cuirassier Regiment (4 sq.)
 Her Majesty Cuirassier Regiment (4 sq.)
 Astrakhan Cuirassier Regiment (4 sq.) (non-Guard status)

As part of the I Cavalry Corps – General Lieutenant Fyodor Uvarov
 1st Brigade – General Major Anton Chalikov
 Lifeguard Dragoon Regiment (4 sq.)
 Lifeguard Uhlan Regiment (4 sq.)
 2nd Brigade – General Major Orlov-Denisov
 Lifeguard Hussar Regiment (4 sq.)

Artillery of the Guard
At Austerlitz in 1805 the artillery of the Guard included the Lifeguard Artillery Battalion under General Major Ivan Kaspersky. At Borodino in 1812 the artillery of the Guard included the Lifeguard Artillery Brigade (now a part of the Guard Infantry Division), the Lifeguard Horse Artillery under Colonel Kozen, attached to the 1st Cuirassier Division, and the
Guard Sapper Battalion.

At Austerlitz in 1805 the Lifeguard Cossack regiment (five sotnias) was attached to the 1st Brigade of the Guard Cavalry Division. At Borodino in 1812 the Cossacks of the Guard included the Lifeguard Cossack regiment (five sotnias), the Black Sea Cossack Guard sotnia, and the Lifeguard Orel sotnia.

The General Staff Academy was established in 1832 in Saint Petersburg to train officers for the Army's General Staff.

The army saw combat against the British and French during the Crimean War of 1853–56.

Jews in the Russian Army 
On August 26, 1827, Nicholas I of Russia declared the "Statute on Conscription Duty".  This statute made it mandatory that all Russian males ages twelve to twenty-five were now required to serve in the Russian armed forces for 25 years. This was the first time that the massive Jewish population was required to serve in the Russian military.  The reasoning for Nicolas for mandatory conscription was because “in the military they would learn not only Russian but also useful skills and crafts, and eventually they would become his loyal subjects."

Many Jewish families began to emigrate out of the Russian Empire in order to escape the conscription obligations. Due to this, the government began to employ khappers who would kidnap Jewish children and turn them over to the government for conscription. It became known that "the khappers were not scrupulous about adhering to the minimum age of 12 and frequently impressed children as young as 8." "By the time the empire collapsed, around 1.5 million Jewish soldiers fulfilled what was often seen as a highly burdensome and intrusive obligation."  At first many Jews were hesitant, but by 1880 Russian Jews were fully integrated into the Russian military.

Cossacks

In the Russian Empire, the Cossacks were organized into several voiskos (hosts), named after the regions of their location, whether along the Russian border, or internal borders between Russian and non-Russian peoples. Each host had its own leadership and traditions as well as uniforms and ranks. However, by the late 19th century, the latter were standardized following the example of the Imperial Russian Army. Each host was required to provide a number of regiments for service in the Imperial Russian Army and for border patrol work. While most Cossacks served as cavalry, there were infantry and artillery units in several of the larger hosts. Three regiments of Cossacks formed part of the Imperial Guard, as well as the konvoi—the emperor's mounted escort. The Imperial Guard regiments wore tailored government-issue uniforms of a spectacular and colourful appearance. As an example, the Konvoi wore scarlet cherkesskas, white beshmets and red crowns on their fleece hats.

Ethnic and religious minorities

The Cossack institution recruited and incorporated Muslim Mishar Tatars. Cossack rank was awarded to Bashkirs. Muslim Turkics and Buddhist Kalmyks served as Cossacks. The Cossack Ural, Terek, Astrakhan, and Don Cossack hosts had Kalmyks in their ranks. Mishar Muslims, Teptiar Muslims, service Tatar Muslims, and Bashkir Muslims joined the Orenburg Cossack Host. Cossack non Muslims shared the same status with Cossack Siberian Muslims. Muslim Cossacks in Siberia requested an Imam. Cossacks in Siberia included Tatar Muslims like in Bashkiria.

Bashkirs and Kalmyks in the Russian military fought against Napoleon's forces. They were judged suitable for inundating opponents but not intense fighting. They were in a non standard capacity in the military. Arrows, bows, and melee combat weapons were wielded by the Muslim Bashkirs. Bashkir women fought among the regiments. Denis Davidov mentioned the arrows and bows wielded by the Bashkirs. Napoleon's forces faced off against Kalmyks on horseback. Napoleon faced light mounted Bashkir forces. Mounted Kalmyks and Bashkirs numbering 100 were available to Russian commandants during the war against Napoleon. Kalmyks and Bashkirs served in the Russian Army in France. A nachalnik was present in every one of the 11 cantons of the Bashkir host which was created by Russia after the Pugachev's Rebellion. Bashkirs had the military statute of 1874 applied to them.

Title, ranks, and insignia, 1917 
See for a more detailed history, ranks, and insignia

Other regiments

Notes

See also
 Imperial Russian Air Service
 Imperial Russian Navy
 Military history of the Russian Empire
 Ranks and rank insignia of the Russian armed forces until 1917
 Signal Corps of the Imperial Russian Army
 Svita
 Mikhail Krichevsky, Ukrainian supercentenarian and last living veteran of the Russian Imperial Army

References
 Jerome Blum, Lord and Peasant in Russia from the Ninth to the Nineteenth Century, Princeton University Press, 1951.
 Chandler, David G., The Campaigns of Napoleon, Simon & Schuster, New York, 1995 
 Fisher, Toddm Fremont-Barnes, Gregory, The Napoleonic Wars: The Rise and Fall of an Empire, Osprey Publishing Ltd., Oxford, 2004 
 Harrison, Richard W. The Russian Way of War: Operational Art, 1904–1940 (University Press of Kansas, 2001)
 Menning, Bruce W. Bayonets before Bullets: The Russian Imperial Army, 1861–1914. (Indiana U.P. 1992).
 Reese, Roger R. The Russian Imperial Army, 1796–1917 (Ashgate 2006)
 Summerfield, Stephen (2005) Cossack Hurrah: Russian Irregular Cavalry Organisation and Uniforms during the Napoleonic Wars, Partizan Press 
 Summerfield, Stephen (2007) The Brazen Cross: Brazen Cross of Courage: Russian Opochenie, Partizans and Russo-German Legion during the Napoleonic Wars, Partizan Press 
 Wildman, Allan K. The End of the Russian Imperial Army: The Old Army and the Soldiers' Revolt (March–Apr. 1917) (Princeton University Press, 1987)
 Deyo, Daniel C. Legions of the East: A Compendium of the Russian Army in the First World War (Counterintelligence Consulting LLC, 2016)

External links
 Mark Conrad’s Home Page – Russian Military History
 Russian army during the Napoleonic Wars
 Anne S. K. Brown Military Collection, Brown University Library Military history and graphics

Disbanded armies
Armies of Napoleonic Wars